Peter Hadfield (born 1 July 1954) is a British freelance journalist and author, trained as a geologist, who runs the YouTube channel Potholer54, which has over 226,000 subscribers. He has previously lived in Japan, and now lives in Australia.

Early life and education 
Hadfield has a degree in geology from Kingston University.

Reporting career 
Hadfield wrote a weekly humour column for The Mainichi Daily News (the English edition of the Japanese-language Mainichi Shimbun) while living in Japan. He was The Sunday Times correspondent in Tokyo from 1988 to 1990, then wrote a regular column for the Daily Mail on life in Japan.

Later he became Tokyo correspondent for the Sunday Telegraph and U.S. News & World Report. He was also the Tokyo correspondent for New Scientist for 14 years. His writing has appeared in other publications, such as the BBC News website, USA Today, The Guardian, The Independent, The Daily Telegraph, The South China Morning Post and The Lancet.

In 1991 Hadfield became Far East correspondent for Monitor Radio, and reported throughout East Asia. During this period, Hadfield wrote and appeared on screen regularly as a correspondent for CNN, the Australian Broadcasting Corporation (ABC), ABC News (U.S.) and the Canadian Broadcasting Corporation (CBC).

Hadfield's book, "Sixty Seconds that Will Change the World," about the potential implications of an earthquake in Tokyo, was published by Sidgwick & Jackson in 1991. A second revised edition was published by Pan and Tuttle in 1995 after the Kobe earthquake.

More recently, he has contributed regularly to the CBC, NPR, and BBC radio programmes Costing The Earth, Science in Action, The World Tonight, Outlook and East Asia Today, as well as the ABC's Science Show.

YouTube career
Hadfield, known on YouTube as "Potholer54" and "Potholer54debunks", has made videos about various scientific topics, such as the science behind global warming, age of the earth and debunking arguments used by young earth creationists to claim the earth or universe are young, and for videos on how tricks of the trade in journalism can be used to fool viewers. For example, his video about how climate change deniers have claimed that the earth has been cooling since 1998 has been featured on Boing Boing, where Maggie Koerth-Baker has called it "true skepticism at its best." Hadfield has also made videos debunking the claims made by comic artist Neal Adams, proponent of the Expanding Earth theory, and Christopher Monckton, 3rd Viscount Monckton of Brenchley about climate change science in public presentations; Hadfield's series on this topic is entitled "Monckton Bunkum." A back-and-forth ensued, in which Monckton responded to Hadfield's video series about him on Watts Up With That?, whereupon Hadfield replied in turn. In March 2010 Hadfield penned an opinion piece on his YouTube series for The Guardian.

As an example of his style of debunking, in June 2013 Hadfield revealed that a photo that was provided as evidence for a link between High Frequency Active Auroral Research Program (HAARP) and the 2004 tsunami in the first episode of the television show Conspiracy Theory with Jesse Ventura, was purchased from a commercial photographer's website. The photo was introduced by the TV-show's lead investigator Raheem as a picture of the Aurora borealis. Hadfield found that the photo was described by the photographer as being of the Aurora Australis.

Hadfield has stated that both sides in the global warming debate have made erroneous statements, saying, "while skeptics like Christopher Monckton and Martin Durkin fabricate a lot of their facts, many environmental activists tend to exaggerate theirs."

References

External links
Peter Hadfield's YouTube channel

The Guardian journalists
Living people
Science-related YouTube channels
British atheists
British video bloggers
British sceptics
Critics of creationism
1954 births
British emigrants to Australia
Educational and science YouTubers
YouTube channels launched in 2007
English-language YouTube channels